Peng Shaoxiong (born 27 May 1989) is a Chinese footballer who currently plays for China League Two side Meizhou Wuhua.

Club career
Peng was loaned to Guangdong Sunray Cave for three seasons and returned to Guangzhou Evergrande in 2010. He made his debut for Guangzhou in a league game on 10 April 2010 in a 3-3 away draw to Pudong Zobon. He scored his first goal for Guangzhou in a league match against Shanghai East Asia on 7 May 2010 and scored the first goal of the match in a 3-1 victory.

Honours

Club
Guangzhou Evergrande
China League One: 2010
Chinese Super League: 2011, 2012
Chinese FA Super Cup: 2012
Chinese FA Cup: 2012

Meizhou Kejia 
China League Two: 2015

References

External links
Player profile at sodasoccer.com

1989 births
Living people
Footballers from Guangzhou
Chinese footballers
Guangdong Sunray Cave players
Guangzhou F.C. players
Meizhou Hakka F.C. players
Chinese Super League players
China League One players
Association football midfielders
21st-century Chinese people